Proroglutea is a genus of parasitic flies in the family Tachinidae.

Species
Proroglutea piligera Townsend, 1919

Distribution
Costa Rica

References

Exoristinae
Diptera of North America
Tachinidae genera
Taxa named by Charles Henry Tyler Townsend